R. Sreelekha (born 25 December 1960) is an officer in the Indian Police Service and the first Lady Officer of the IPS from Kerala, India. Sreelekha is also an author and now running a successful YouTube channel- “Sasneham Sreelekha” (With Love, Sreelekha) to share her experiences as a police officer. She has also served as managing director for public sector organisations in Kerala. During her tenure in the CBI, she earned the nickname of 'Raid Sreelekha'.

Early life and family 

Sreelekha was born on the Christmas day of 1960, as one of the daughters of Prof. N. Velayudhan Nair and B. Radhamma. Sreelekha's father Prof. N. Velayudhan Nair had fought the Second World War as a soldier in the Indian Army, on the side of the Allied Forces. Sreelekha is married to Dr. Sethunath, Prof. Paediatric Surgery, Medical College Hospital, Thiruvananthapuram and has one son, Gokul.

Education 

Sreelekha completed her schooling from Government Higher Secondary School for Girls, Cotton Hill in Thiruvananthapuram where she was involved in various activities like music, drama, NCC and NSS. 

She then went on to complete her bachelor's degree in English Literature at the Government College for Women, Thiruvananthapuram. She then did her master's at the Institute of English in the University of Kerala. In 2005, while in service, she obtained an MBA in Human Resource Management from IGNOU.

She was awarded the prestigious Chevening Fellowship by the Government of the United Kingdom and she undertook the fellowship studies in King's College, London, Sciences Po Paris, Edinburgh University, United Nations offices in Geneva and Oxford from September to December 2015.

She also attended the Mid-Career Training Program at the London Business School and Metropolitan Police (Scotland Yard) in 2013.

Career 

Early career

Prior to joining the police service, Sreelekha, worked as a lecturer at the Shree Vidyadhiraja College. She also worked for the Reserve Bank of India, as a Grade B Officer and was posted as a Statistical Officer in Mumbai.

Indian Police Service

In January 1987, at the age of 26, Sreelekha became the first woman IPS officer in Kerala Cadre.

After joining the police service, she has served as District Superintendent of Police in 3 districts, Alappuzha, Pathanamthitta and Thrissur. Sreelekha also worked with the Central Bureau of Investigation for 4 years as Superintendent of Police in Kerala and DIG in New Delhi. She was promoted to Deputy Inspector General of the Ernakulam Range.

In 2005, Sreelekha was posted as the Managing Director of the Kerala State Co-operative Rubber Marketing Federation. In June 2007, she was posted as the Managing Director of the Roads and Bridges Development Corporation of Kerala.
Later on, she also served as the Inspector General, Crime Branch.
She also served as Addl. DGP, Armed Police Battalions with additional charge for Training.
From her posting as ADGP Vigilance, on 15 February 2014, she has been posted as ADGP (Police Home Guards, Community Policing, Gender Justice and Nodal Officer for Nirbhaya).

She was the Organising Secretary of the 5th National Conference of Women in Police, organised by the Bureau of Police Research & Development in July 2012, and is also a strong advocate of gender parity in the Kerala Police force. As ADGP, Sreelekha was asked by Kerala Home Minister, Thiruvanchoor Radhakrishnan to conduct an inquiry into the involvement of Kerala Information Commissioner K. Natarajan, who had allegedly persuaded a Dy.S.P of Police to leave out the name of V. S. Achuthanandan from the list of accused in a land scam case. After completion of investigations, Sreelekha recommended the suspension of the Information Commissioner, upon finding that the official had misused his office.
R. Sreelekha as ADGP Vigilance & anti-corruption Bureau, chargesheeted the Disproportionate Asset case against IG Tomin J. Thachankary, accused also in several other cases. As retaliation, Thachankary accused Sreelekha for violating norms in visiting Thailand prior to Government Permission.

Sreelekha  sought permission from the government to file a defamation suit against Tomin J. Thachankary, and obtained the same. As the Transport Commissioner in Kerala, she reduced the road accidents and fatalities substantially through inclusive road safety measures and in 2014, there were 292 less fatalities in Kerala against the statistics in 2013, which was a record achievement in India. The revenue from taxes and penalties reached an all-time high of Rs 3000 crore during her tenure. Motor Vehicle Department became successful in e-governance, Vahan-Sarathy was completed and an android app called 'Smart trace' was made to detect vehicle duplications and digital record of around 98 lakh vehicles in the state. She also conducted Asia's first ever Road Hackathon with assistance from the World Bank, at Technopark where over 300 participants showcased their technological innovations to better road safety in the State. 

For detecting Praveen Murder case in Kottayam and arresting the then - DySP R Shaji and also for getting lifetime imprisonment for him and his accomplices within 90 days of chargesheeting the case, she was awarded the Government's Meritorious Service Award.

She was the officer investigating the Kiliroor sex scandal case, and reported to the CBI court that there was no VIP involved. Thomas Chandy, an MLA and K. P. Mohanan was accused of being linked to the case. However, Sreelekha's deposition to the court was on the basis of the statement from the victim which absolved the two. R.Sreelekha investigated the irregularities in Consumerfed in procuring rice above the market price and for irregularities found in various godowns in Kochi and Thiruvananthapuram She was the Transport Commissioner of Kerala from July 2013 to September 2015, during which time, road accidents and fatalities were at an all-time low. Asia's first ever road safety Hackathon conducted by her with assistance from World Bank at Technopark Trivandrum was a huge success. 

As ADGP Crime Records Bureau, she completed the Crime & Criminal Tracking networking system and started an interactive website "THUNA" (The Hand U Need for Assistance)  for a public interface with police. As Additional DGP, Intelligence, Kerala from June 2016 to  January 2017, her proposal to start a counseling center HATS (Help and Assistance to Tackle Stress) for police officers who are suffering from mental stress, to help those who have personal problems such as addiction, issues with senior officers, family problems, financial problems, suicide tendencies etc. has been approved by the Department.

She got promoted to the rank of Director General of Police in September, 2017. From January 2017 to June 2019, she worked as the Director General of Prisons and Correctional Services in Kerala. She had introduced several positive changes in the 54 prisons in the State  which are now referred to as Correctional Centers. From June 2017 to 1 June 2020, she was the head of a newly created post, "Social Policing & Traffic" in Kerala and was stationed at the Kerala State Police Headquarters.

She took charge as the DGP heading the Kerala Fire And Rescue Services on 1 June 2020, becoming the first 'Woman DGP' of independent charge in Kerala.

She retired on 31 December 2020, as the Director General of the Kerala Fire And Rescue Services, after completing 33 years and 5 months in the service.

Medals and recognition 

 In 2004, as DIG Vigilance and Anti-Corruption Bureau, Sreelekha was awarded the President's Police Medal for Meritorious Service.
 In 2013, as ADGP Vigilance and Anti-Corruption Bureau, Sreelekha was awarded the President's Police Medal for Distinguished Service.
 In 2006, during her stint as managing director, the Rubber Board won the Thailand Government's Best Exporter of Rubber in Asia award. 
 Sreelekha was selected for the prestigious Chevening Fellowship by the Government of United Kingdom and she attended the fellowship in London at King's College from September to December 2015. She also attended specialised training at Scotland Yard/metropolitan police of UK. 
 She won the Indian Overseas Award for Public Service in 2006.
 FOKANA award for literary contributions was given to her in 2005.
 In 2007, she received the Kerala Government's Meritorious Services Award for detecting the sensational case of the murder of a civilian named Praveen by the then-Deputy Superintendent of Police R Shaji. After the investigation, Shaji was found guilty by the court.

Selected works 

Sreelekha has penned and published 9 books.

  Cheru marmarangal (2005)
 Neerazhikapuram (2006)
 Maranna Doothan (2008)
 Kuzhaloothukaran (2009)
 Lottos Theenikal (2009)
 Mansile Mazhavillu (2011)
 Niyama samrakshanam Streekalkku- a book on legal awareness to women
 Kuttikalum Policum- a book for the children about Police and their activities
 Jaagarookan (2013)- Detective novel Publisher DC Books
 Thamasoma- Detective series in Kerala Koumudi magazine

She writes regular columns in periodicals and magazines. Her column in Vanitha Magazine, "Marupuram, the Other Side" which is being published now is well appreciated by the readers.

Sasneham Sreelekha- YouTube Channel

https://youtube.com/channel/UCup0QqQP2A95jqYkzJuuU9w

See also
Kappazhom Raman Pillai

References

External links 
 Interview on Asianet On Record
 https://web.archive.org/web/20150923213053/http://www.dcbooks.com/jagarookan-released.html
 https://www.amazon.in/Books-R-Sreelekha/s?ie=UTF8&page=1&rh=n%3A976389031%2Cp_27%3AR%20Sreelekha
 http://www.bharatchannels.com/asianet-news-shows-watch-online/sreelekha-ips-transport-commissioner-detective-fiction-released-video_7cf630261.html
 http://malayalam.tv.cybernewsblog.com/interview-r-sreelekha-ips-transport-commissioner-in-varthaprabhatham

1960 births
Living people
People from Thiruvananthapuram
University of Kerala alumni
Articles created or expanded during Women's History Month (India) - 2014
Indian women police officers
Women from Kerala
Indian civil servants
Civil Servants from Kerala